Agualonga is a civil parish in the municipality of Paredes de Coura, Portugal. The population in 2011 was 295, in an area of 5.32 km2.

References

Freguesias of Paredes de Coura